The mixed team badminton event at the 2022 Commonwealth Games was held from 29 July to 2 August at the National Exhibition Centre in Solihull.

Schedule
All times based on British Summer Time (UTC+01:00)

Qualification
Sixteen nations are also entitled to contest the mixed team event; subject to at least four CGF regions being represented and a minimum entry of two men / two women per team, they qualify as follows:
 The host nation.
 The top fourteen nations in the BWF World Ranking as of 1 February 2022, excluding the host nation. Their highest-ranked players in each of the five individual rankings are added together to determine the combined ranking.
 One nation not already qualified receives a CGF/BWF Bipartite Invitation.

Note

Competition format
In March 2022, sixteen teams were drawn into four groups in accordance with their qualification ranking; the top two performing teams in each group advance to the knockout stage. Each tie consists of five matches, one for each discipline (men's / women's singles, men's / women's / mixed doubles).

Group stage

Group A

Group B

Group C

Group D

Knockout stage

Quarter-finals

Semi-finals

Bronze medal game

Gold medal game

References

Team
Commonwealth